Mancilla is a Spanish surname. Notable people with the surname include:
Alicia Mancilla (born 1999), Guatemalan swimmer
Eder Mancilla (born 1986), Venezuelan football manager
Harrinson Mancilla (born 1991), Colombian footballer
Héctor Mancilla (born 1980), Chilean footballer
Horacio Mancilla, Mexican voice-over, dubbing actor and writer
José Carrillo Mancilla (born 1995), Spanish footballer
Luis Argel Mancilla (born 1959), Argentine skier
Nicolás Mancilla (born 1993), Chilean footballer
Niusha Mancilla (born 1971), Bolivian former middle and long-distance runner
Sebastian Mancilla Olivares (1956–2009), Chilean writer, director, and playwright
Sergio Mancilla Zayas (born 1971), Mexican politician
Víctor Mancilla (1921–2011), Chilean footballer

See also
Mansilla (surname)
Candelario Mancilla, a small settlement in the Aysén Region, Chile
César Mancillas Amador (born 1958), Mexican politician
Jorge Luis Mancillas Ramírez, Mexican jurist

Spanish-language surnames